Juan Ramón Isasi (born 22 September 1959 in Asunción, Paraguay) is a former football forward. Isasi played for most of his career in Universidad Católica. He was part of the 1984 Universidad Católica team that won the Primera División de Chile. He was a member of the Paraguayan squad at the 1979 FIFA World Youth Championship.

Titles

References

1959 births
Living people
Paraguayan footballers
Paraguay under-20 international footballers
Paraguayan expatriate footballers
Club Deportivo Universidad Católica footballers
Chilean Primera División players
Expatriate footballers in Chile
Association football forwards